"Fed" is the eleventh episode of the twentieth season of NBC's long-running legal drama Law & Order.

Plot
As election day rapidly approaches, Detectives Lupo and Bernard discover the disfigured remains of a man with the word "FED" written across his bare chest. Missing a crucial piece of evidence, the detectives decide to retrace the steps of the victim, who is a campaign volunteer. After the victim's perplexing past emerges and the list of suspects multiplies, the detectives find themselves dealing with more than just dirty politics.

Rey Curtis, having recently lost his wife Deborah, has come back to Long Island with his three daughters to bury her beside her parents. Lt. Van Buren receives a call from Curtis inviting her to the funeral. Ill with cancer herself, she was able to make it to the funeral despite her busy schedule. Curtis, who heard about Van Buren's illness from the police grapevine, commented gravely about her cancer as "just rotten luck all around". He described Deborah's lost battle with multiple sclerosis, how she faced death bravely but was overwhelmed by it in the end. Curtis also tells Van Buren that Deborah died at home in his arms and revealed that he had called his old partner, Lennie Briscoe, just before he died. By the end of the episode, Lt. Van Buren is doubtful of her own survival.

Reception
On its original American broadcast on December 11, 2009, "Fed" was watched by 8.77 million average households over the hour, among viewers aged between 18 and 49, according to Nielsen ratings. The episode had outperformed Yes, Virginia on CBS, which drew only 5.27 million households as well as a repeat of an episode of The Big Bang Theory also on CBS which drew only 4.55 million households. Also outperforming Supernanny on ABC with only 4.63 million households, Dollhouse on Fox with only 2.72 million households and a repeat episode of Smallville on The CW with only 1.36 million households making Law & Order the highest-rated scripted drama series of the night only to be surpassed by Dateline NBC which pulled 9.27 million households.

Trivia

 Inspired by:
 The death of Bill Sparkman, a United States Census Bureau field worker found dead in rural eastern Kentucky with the word "fed" written on his chest. The death was investigated as a homicide but later determined to be a suicide made to appear as a homicide.
 ACORN and the ACORN 2009 undercover videotaping scandal.

External links
IMDb.com

References

Law & Order episodes
2009 American television episodes